West End Pond is a wetland in Anguilla, a British Overseas Territory in the Caribbean Sea. It is one of the territory's Important Bird Areas (IBAs).

Description
The pond is a 19 ha brackish lagoon in the West End district, near the south-western end of the main island, and was historically used for salt production. It has a marl substrate and rocky shoreline and is divided by a culverted causeway that provides access to tourism development along the beach at Shoal Bay West. The eastern basin of the pond is roughly circular and about 370 m across, while the western section is longer and narrower. It is mostly surrounded by stands of black, white and buttonwood mangroves.

Birds
The IBA was identified as such by BirdLife International because it supports populations of royal and common terns, Caribbean elaenias and Lesser Antillean bullfinches.

References

Important Bird Areas of Anguilla
Wetlands of Anguilla
Lagoons of Anguilla